Yui Kamiji defeated Momoko Ohtani in the final, 6–2, 6–1 to win the women's singles wheelchair tennis title at the 2020 French Open.

Diede de Groot was the defending champion, but was defeated by Ohtani in the semifinals.

Seeds

Draw

Finals

References

External links
 Draw

Wheelchair Women's Singles
French Open, 2020 Women's Singles